The Ashtavakra Gita (Sanskrit: अष्टावक्रगीता; IAST: aṣṭāvakragītā) or Song of Ashtavakra is a classical Hindu text in the form of a dialogue between the sage Ashtavakra and Janaka, king of Mithila.

Dating
Radhakamal Mukerjee, an Indian social scientist, dated the book to the period immediately after the Hindu scripture Bhagavad Gita (c. 500–400 BCE). J. L. Brockington, emeritus professor of Sanskrit at the University of Edinburgh, places the Ashtavakra Gita much later, supposing it to have been written either in the eighth century CE by a follower of Adi Shankara, or in the fourteenth century during a resurgence of Shankara's teaching. Sri Swami Shantananda Puri suggests that since the book contains the seed of the theory of non-creation Ajata Vada developed later by Gaudapada in Mandookya Karika, this book comes from a period prior to that of Gaudapada (6th century CE) and hence prior to Shankara.

Identification of Ashtavakra
Ashtavakra is probably identical to the holy sage with the same name who appears in Mahabharata, though the connection is not clearly stated in any of the texts. Mukherjee identifies Janaka as the father of Sita and disciple of the sage Yajnavalkya in the Brihadaranyaka Upanishad. Janaka is  also depicted as a king who has attained perfection in vedas.

Contents

Overview

Ashtavakra Gita is a dialogue between Ashtavakra and Janaka on the nature of Self/Atman, reality and bondage. It offers a radical version of non-dualist philosophy. The Gita insists on the complete unreality of the external world and absolute oneness of existence. It does not mention any morality or duties, and therefore is seen by commentators as 'godless'. It also dismisses names and forms as unreal and a sign of ignorance.

In a conversation between Janaka and Ashtavakra, pertaining to the deformity of his crooked body, Ashtavakra explains that the size of a temple is not affected by how it is shaped, and the shape of his own body does not affect himself (or Atman). The ignorant man's vision is shrouded by names and forms, but a wise man sees only himself:

Structure
The book comprises 20 chapters:
 I  Saksi - Vision of the Self as the All-pervading Witness
 II Ascaryam - Marvel of the Infinite Self Beyond Nature
 III Atmadvaita - Self in All and All in the Self
 IV Sarvamatma - Knower and the Non-knower of the Self
 V Laya - Stages of Dissolution of Consciousness
 VI Prakrteh Parah - Irrelevance of Dissolution of Consciousness
 VII Santa - Tranquil and Boundless Ocean of the Self
 VIII Moksa - Bondage and Freedom
 IX Nirveda - Indifference
 X Vairagya - Dispassion
 XI Cidrupa - Self as Pure and Radiant Intelligence
 XII Svabhava - Ascent of Contemplation
 XIII Yathasukham - Transcendent Bliss
 XIV Isvara - Natural Dissolution of the Mind
 XV Tattvam - Unborn Self or Brahman
 XVI Svasthya - Self-Abidance through Obliteration of the World
 XVII Kaivalya - Absolute Aloneness of the Self
 XVIII Jivanmukti - Way and Goal of Natural Samadhi
 XIX Svamahima - Majesty of the Self
 XX Akincanabhava - Transcendence of the Self

Appreciation
The work was known, appreciated and quoted by Ramakrishna and his disciple Vivekananda, as well as Ramana Maharshi. Sarvepalli Radhakrishnan refers to it with great respect.

Ashtavakra Gita continues to inspire people. The first musical form of Ashtavakra Gita  Saksi I (Chapter 1) was set in the raga Svadhya by Composer Rajan.

Translations and commentaries
Nath (1907) opened the discourse of this Gita into the English language. 

Swami Nityaswarupananda has written a word by word translation from 1929 to 1931.

Radhakamal Mukerjee (1889–1968) continued the discourse into English with his work posthumously published in 1971. Stroud (2004) wrote on the Astavakra Gita as a work of multivalent narrative.

Swami Chinmayananda  wrote a commentary on the Ashtavakra Gita, which has references to the Upanishads to help convey the meaning of the text.

John Richards published an English translation of the Ashtavakra Gita in 1997 

Osho has given commentary on Ashtavakra Gita in a long series of 91 discourses named as Ashtavakra Mahageeta, given in his Pune Ashram.

Sri Sri Ravi Shankar has given commentary on Ashtavakra Gita in Hindi and English.

Pujya Gurudevshri Rakeshbhai has given commentary on Ashtavakra Gita through 60 discourses totalling more than 116 hours.

The Book has also been translated into Urdu language with the title of Mehak-e-Agahi (2021).

See also 

 Avadhuta Gita
 Ribhu Gita
 Bhagavad Gita
 Bhagavata Purana
 The Ganesha Gita
 Puranas
 Self-consciousness (Vedanta)
 Uddhava Gita
 Vedas
 Prasthanatrayi
 Vyadha Gita

Notes

References

Sources

External links

Original text 
 

 In original Sanskrit as PDF
 In original Sanskrit
 In Devanagari
 In Romanized Sanskrit
 Ashtavakra Gita in Devanagari with English translation side by side

Translations
 
 
 The Ultimate Reality Within  
 Poetic translation of Ashtavakra Gita in Hindi by Dr Mridul Kirti
 The Heart of Awareness, poetic translation by Thomas Byrom, pdf
 s:Ashtavakra Gita Translation at Wikisource by John Richards
 Ashtavakra Gita, translation by John Richards
 John Richards translation  
 First in a series of 41 Discourses on Ashtavakra Gita, available for free downloading
 Astavakra Samhita, translation by Swami Nityaswarupananda  
 [https://www.scribd.com/doc/2673274/AshTavakra-Geeta Swami Nityaswarupananda (1940): AshTavakra Geeta, Sanskrit text with word-for-word translation, English rendering and comments]
 Asthavakra Gita - Awareness is Everything''. Translation and commentary by Mansoor (2010). 

 audio books
 Ashtavakra Gita English Audio Book
 Ashtavakra Gita Hindi Audio Book
 Ashtavakra Gita Marathi Audio Book
 Translation by Ramana Maharshi (audiobook)

Hindu texts
Ancient Indian literature
Advaita Vedanta